Champex (also Champex-Lac) is a village located in the French-speaking Swiss canton of Valais, part of the municipality of Orsières.

The village lies at 1,470 metres on the shore of Lac de Champex, at the foot of the Mont Blanc Massif. It is a starting point for many hikes into the surrounding mountains and huts (La Breya, Cabane du Trient, Le Catogne). Champex is also a small ski resort.

The Champex Pass is located a few hundred metres west of Champex.

External links
Champex, tourist office
 http://www.champex.info/   website in English providing details of village, events, accommodation, etc.

Villages in Valais
Ski areas and resorts in Switzerland